Daily Soap Dish is a TV and entertainment news website. Started by Daniel Babis in 2018, the site originally only focused on covering the four main American soap operas: The Young and the Restless, The Bold and the Beautiful, Days of Our Lives, and General Hospital. It has since expanded its coverage into 90 Day Fiancé, reality TV, the British royal family, and other general TV and entertainment news.

In May 2020, Daily Soap Dish broke the story about a 90 Day Fiancé cast member having allegedly assaulted a young girl.

According to SimilarWeb, the site garners around 700,000 users.

References 

American entertainment news websites